Karen "Duff" Duffy (born May 23, 1961) is an American writer, model, television personality, and actress. She is a certified hospital chaplain, a former Coney Island Mermaid Queen, and one of People Magazine's "50 Most Beautiful People" in 1993. In 1995, Duffy was diagnosed with a rare form of the disease sarcoidosis called neurosarcoidosis. Since then, she's written two books about her experience living with chronic pain and is a member of the Alliance for the Ethical Treatment of Pain Patients.

Early life
Duffy was raised Catholic, and is of Irish descent. She attended Park Ridge High School in Park Ridge, New Jersey, graduating in 1979. She received a bachelor's degree in recreational therapy from the University of Colorado Boulder.

Film and television career
By 1989, Duffy was modeling and appearing in television commercials. She was a VJ for MTV in the early 1990s, under the name "Duff." She had small roles in a handful of films including Dumb and Dumber and Blank Check, and by 1995 was working as a correspondent for documentary filmmaker Michael Moore on his television shows TV Nation and The Awful Truth. She also was a Revlon "Charlie Girl" as well as the face of Almay Cosmetics, and co-hosted the pay-per-view television event, Elvis: The Tribute from the Memphis Pyramid in 1994 with Kris Kristofferson.

In 2006, Duffy hosted House of Tiny Terrors on TLC. On July 7, 2007, she appeared on the Live Earth telecast on the Bravo Channel as a co-host at Giants Stadium, East Rutherford, New Jersey.

In 2008, Duffy began working with New York City's NYC Media on a series of emergency preparedness videos. The videos, which mimic the style of the network TV show Secrets of New York, help raise awareness of the perils of natural disasters and preventative actions families should take to prepare for them.

Writing and speaking on sarcoidosis 
In 1995, Duffy was diagnosed with a rare form of the disease sarcoidosis called neurosarcoidosis. Her brain and spinal cord were affected, leaving her partially paralyzed.

Duffy is the author of the New York Times bestselling memoir Model Patient: My Life as an Incurable Wise-Ass. In her latest book, Backbone: Living With Chronic Pain Without Turning Into One, she describes her ongoing incurable disease and constant pain, using humor and acceptance of her condition to cope. She was inspired to write the second book by Lord Byron, who wrote "Always laugh when you can, it is cheap medicine." 

Her articles on a wide range of subjects have appeared in numerous media outlets, including The New York Times and Oprah Magazine. She spoke at the 2018 US Pain Foundation annual gala.

Personal life
She married John Lambros in 1997. They have one son, Jack "Lefty" Lambros, who was born via surrogate in 2003.

Filmography

Bibliography
 Karen Duffy. Model Patient: My Life as an Incurable Wise-Ass. 2001. .
 Karen Duffy. A Slob in the Kitchen. 2004. .
 Karen Duffy. Backbone: Living With Chronic Pain Without Turning Into One.

References

External links
 
 Former MTV VJ tells of battle with chronic illness, by Kat Carney. September 19, 2003, CNN.com.
 COURTTV.COM ONAIR
 Bravo TV Live Earth Bio
 

Female models from New Jersey
1961 births
Actresses from New York City
Actresses from New Jersey
American film actresses
American television actresses
Television personalities from New York City
American women television personalities
American people of Irish descent
American people with disabilities
American voice actresses
Living people
Park Ridge High School alumni
People with sarcoidosis
People from Park Ridge, New Jersey
VJs (media personalities)
20th-century American actresses
21st-century American actresses
Catholics from New York (state)
University of Colorado Boulder alumni
Female models from New York (state)
Models from New York City